Antonio Farina (fl. 1675) was an Italian composer active in Venice. He is remembered for his serenatas.

Recordings
3 serenatas on Serenate Napoletane, Andréanne Paquin, Ensemble Odysee dir. Andrea Friggi Pan Classics 2013

References

17th-century Italian composers
Italian Baroque composers
Italian male classical composers
17th-century male musicians